The subfamily Talpinae, sometimes called "Old World moles" or "Old World moles and relatives", is one of three subfamilies of the mole family Talpidae, the others being the Scalopinae, or New World moles, and the Uropsilinae, or shrew-like moles.

These mammals in the order Eulipotyphla mainly live under ground. The species in this group are all found in Eurasia, except Neurotrichus gibbsii. Most species have front paws specialized for tunneling which are clawed and face outwards from the body. They mainly eat insects and other small invertebrates.

Taxonomy 
Although most systems recognize this subfamily as monophyletic, some studies indicate that it as currently defined is paraphyletic with respect to the Scalopinae, with Desmanini being the most basal member, then a clade comprising Neurotrichini, Scaptonychini, and Urotrichini, then the Condylurini (otherwise classified in the Scalopinae), and then Talpini and Scalopini being sister groups to one another.

The list of species is:
 Subfamily Talpinae
 Tribe Desmanini
 Genus Desmana
 Russian desman, Desmana moschata
 Genus Galemys
 Pyrenean desman, Galemys pyrenaicus
 Tribe Neurotrichini
 Genus Neurotrichus
 American shrew mole, Neurotrichus gibbsii
 Tribe Scaptonychini
 Genus Scaptonyx
 Long-tailed mole, Scaptonyx fusicauda
 Tribe Talpini
Genus Euroscaptor
 Greater Chinese mole, E. grandis
 Kloss's mole, E. klossi
 Kuznetsov's mole, E. kuznetsovi
 Long-nosed mole, E. longirostris
 Malaysian mole, E. malayanus 
 Himalayan mole, E. micrurus
 Ngoc Linh mole, E. ngoclinhensis
 Orlov's mole, E. orlovi
 Small-toothed mole, E. parvidens
 Vietnamese mole, E. subanura
 Genus Mogera
 Echigo mole, M. etigo
 Small Japanese mole, M. imaizumii
 Insular mole, M. insularis
 Kano's mole, M. kanoana
 La Touche's mole, M. latouchei
 Ussuri mole, M. robusta
 Sado mole, M. tokudae
 Senkaku mole, M. uchidai
 Japanese mole, M. wogura
 Genus Oreoscaptor
 Japanese mountain mole, O. mizura
 Genus Parascaptor
 White-tailed mole, P. leucura
 Genus Scaptochirus - China
 Short-faced mole, S. moschatus
 Genus Talpa
 Altai mole, T. altaica
 Aquitanian mole, T. aquitania
 Blind mole, T. caeca
 Caucasian mole, T. caucasica
 Père David's mole, T. davidiana
 European mole, T. europaea
 Levant mole, T. levantis
 Martino's mole, T. martinorum
 Spanish mole, T. occidentalis
 Ognev's mole, T. ognevi
 Roman mole, T. romana
 Balkan mole, T. stankovici
 Talysch mole, T. talyschensis
 Tribe Urotrichini
 Genus Dymecodon
 True's shrew mole, Dymecodon pilirostris
 Genus Urotrichus
 Japanese shrew mole, Urotrichus talpoides

References

External links
ADW - Talpinae

Talpidae